Alba Ruiz Soto (born 20 june 2003) is a Spanish footballer who plays as a forward for Madrid CFF.

Ruiz started her career at Madrid CFF's academy.

References

External links
Profile at La Liga

2001 births
Living people
Women's association football forwards
Spanish women's footballers
Footballers from Madrid
Madrid CFF players
Primera División (women) players
Segunda Federación (women) players